The 1996 East Carolina Pirates football team was an American football team that represented East Carolina University as an independent during the 1996 NCAA Division I-A football season. In their fifth season under head coach Steve Logan, the team compiled a 8–3 record. The Pirates offense scored 316 points while the defense allowed 214 points.

Schedule

Roster

References

East Carolina
East Carolina Pirates football seasons
East Carolina Pirates football